Carreramyia is a genus of hoverflies, with five known species currently.

Biology
Larvae are found in ant nests.

Distribution
Distribution is Neotropical.

Species
C. flava (Sack, 1941)
C. jattai Carvalho-Filho, 2014
C. megacephalus (Shannon, 1925)
C. megacera Reemer, 2013
C. tigrina Reemer, 2013

References

Hoverfly genera
Microdontinae